Jawornica may refer to the following places in Poland:
Jawornica, Lower Silesian Voivodeship (south-west Poland)
Jawornica, Silesian Voivodeship (south Poland)